= Products Finishing =

- Editor: Scott Francis
- Frequency: Monthly
- Circulation: 31,213
- Publisher: Todd Luciano
- First issue: 1936
- Company: Gardner Business Media, Inc.
- Country: United States
- Based in: Cincinnati, Ohio
- Language: English
- Website: www.pfonline.com
- ISSN: 0032-9940

Products Finishing (ISSN 0032-9940) is a monthly B2B trade magazine and media brand focused on organic and inorganic surface finishing technologies and their industrial applications. Founded in 1936 by Donald Gardner of Gardner Publications, Inc., it is one of the oldest continuously published trade publications in the North American manufacturing sector. The brand covers electroplating, powder coating, liquid painting, anodizing, chemical conversion coatings, cleaning and pretreatment, and related surface treatment technologies used in manufacturing.

The Publisher is Todd Luciano, the Editor is Scott Francis. Editorial offices are located in Cincinnati, Ohio, USA. Products Finishing is published 12 times per year and is supported by a digital platform, e-newsletters, and live events including the Products Finishing Top Shops Benchmarking program and an annual conference.

== History ==
Donald Gardner launched Products Finishing in October 1936 under Gardner Publications, Inc., the same company that had published Modern Machine Shop since 1928. In the introductory letter of the first issue, Gardner noted that due to rapid advancements in the engineering and production of metal products, appearance had become a critical factor in the merchandising of metal goods. The magazine's stated mission was to search out and disseminate the newest and best information available concerning metal finishing methods, including cleaning, polishing, buffing, plating, and lacquering.

The publication has remained part of the Gardner Business Media family continuously since its founding, making it one of the longest-standing members of the portfolio. It has grown from a print-only publication to a multi-channel media brand serving surface finishing professionals across North America.

== Coverage and content ==
Products Finishing covers the full spectrum of industrial surface treatment, including electroplating (decorative and functional), powder coating, liquid spray finishing, anodizing, chemical film conversion coatings, cleaning and pretreatment, quality control, environmental compliance, and equipment for finishing operations.

The brand produces the annual Products Finishing Top Shops Benchmarking Survey, which benchmarks high-performing finishing operations across North America on technology adoption, quality systems, and business management. Products Finishing also co-produced the inaugural Products Finishing Summit in 2022 in partnership with other Gardner Business Media brands.
